"War of Nerves" is an episode from the TV series M*A*S*H, the fourth episode of its sixth season. Originally airing on October 11, 1977, with a rebroadcast on June 5, 1978 (which saw CBS move the show to Mondays at 9 p.m.), it was written and directed by Alan Alda.

Overview
Hawkeye and B.J. are surprised to find Sidney Freedman among the latest batch of incoming casualties. He had gone to the front lines to check up on Tom, a soldier who had previously been sent to the 4077th after being wounded. Sidney had counseled him and returned him to duty, but both of them were hit in an artillery barrage during his visit.

The whole camp is on edge due to a series of petty squabbles, so Colonel Potter offers to discreetly send some of the personnel to meet with Sidney and talk out their frustrations. Sidney is able to get them to reflect on the causes of their anxieties, and their moods begin to improve. Hawkeye and B.J. are surprised to see Tom in good spirits so soon after his first visit, which Sidney explains as a result of getting soldiers back on the front lines as quickly as possible. However, when face to face, Tom angrily berates Sidney for sending him back into battle so that he could be wounded again and vows never to forgive him. Afterward, Sidney and Father Mulcahy discuss the pain they feel when they lose someone under their respective care - a mind and a soul, respectively - and Mulcahy urges Sidney to focus on the success he has had in treating soldiers.

Meanwhile,  Sergeant Zale and  Private Straminsky have been tasked with burning a batch of disease-infested clothing confiscated from Chinese patients. They argue back and forth at first, but soon decide to work together and add other combustible items to the pile in order to make a larger fire. An unamused Potter initially orders them to remove the extra material, but Sidney persuades him to let them go ahead with it as a way to relieve stress. The camp builds and lights a huge bonfire, throwing on items of particular annoyance (such as a copy of the Army cookbook, Radar's bugle, and Sidney's fatigues), and sings "Keep the Home Fires Burning."

The next morning, Radar digs his bugle out of the ashes and plays reveille, with Potter jokingly remarking that the instrument sounds slightly better for having been put in the fire.

Cast
Guest cast is Allan Arbus as Major Sidney Freedman, Johnny Haymer as Staff Sergeant Zelmo Zale, Peter Riegert as Private Igor Straminsky, and Michael O'Keefe as Tom.

In "Mad Dogs and Servicemen", Michael O'Keefe played a soldier who suffered from hysterical paralysis. While the name of the soldier was Corporal Richard Travis, his middle name/nickname might have been "Tom". There are other indications, however, that despite the obvious similarities between the episodes there are also some notable differences: In the earlier episode, O'Keefe's character arrives at the 4077th with Hysterical Paralysis (without mentioning any specific incident that may have triggered it), so Hawkeye and Trapper contact Sidney by phone who advises them offscreen to try his technique themselves - which they do, and after some initial setbacks O'Keefe's character regains his mobility and returns to the front; however in this episode (despite utilizing the same guest actor, same diagnosis, and a similar scenario) Sidney claims that O'Keefe's character was carried into his office after witnessing 3 of his friends killed, and that he worked with the soldier directly before returning him to the front himself. He also appears grateful and shows no anger towards Hawkeye as he did in the prior episode for his role in returning him to the front, and instead directs all his hostility at Sidney.

One of two episodes where Private Igor Straminsky was played by Peter Riegert, instead of Jeff Maxwell, who portrayed Igor in 59 episodes over the run of the show.

References

External links

M*A*S*H (season 6) episodes
1977 American television episodes
Television episodes directed by Alan Alda